Donald Percel "Donnie" Shanklin (November 3, 1946 — August 8, 2009) was a professional American football running back and wide receiver. He played college football at Kansas.

College career
Shanklin was a three-year letter winner for the Kansas Jayhawks. As a sophomore, he led the Jayhawks with 732 rushing yards on 182 carries with two touchdowns. As a senior, he rushed for 772 yards and eight touchdowns while also catching four passes for 65 yards and one touchdown. Shanklin was named the MVP of the 1969 Orange Bowl, his final collegiate game, gaining 122 all-purpose yards in a 15-14 loss to Penn State.

Professional career
Shanklin was selected in the 10th round of the 1969 NFL/AFL draft by the Philadelphia Eagles but was cut during training camp. He was then signed by the BC Lions of the Canadian Football League. In 1970 Shanklin joined the Jersey Jays on the minor league Atlantic Coast Football League and changed positions wide receiver, catching 44 passes for a league-leading 1,023 yards and six touchdowns. He set a league record with 314 receiving yards and five touchdown receptions on October 10, 1970 against the Richmond Saints. Shanklin was signed by the ACFL's Bridgeport Jets where he played in 1971 and 1973 and was named All-ACFL in both seasons. Shanklin was signed by the Philadelphia Bell of the World Football League.

Personal
After retiring from football, Shanklin became a professional golfer. His younger brother, Ronnie Shanklin, was a Pro Bowl wide receiver for the Pittsburgh Steelers. Shanklin died on August 30, 2009.

References

1946 births
2009 deaths
American football running backs
American football wide receivers
Kansas Jayhawks football players
BC Lions players
Players of American football from Texas
Philadelphia Bell players
Sportspeople from Amarillo, Texas
Philadelphia Eagles players
Atlantic Coast Football League players
American players of Canadian football